Christian Pravda (8 March 1927 – 11 November 1994) was an Austrian alpine ski racer.

He was born in Kufstein, Austria.

At age 20, he participated in the 1948 Winter Olympics in the slalom, but was disqualified.

At the 1952 Winter Olympics in Oslo, Norway, Pravda won two medals: silver in giant slalom and a bronze medal in the downhill.

Pravda won the prestigious Hahnenkamm downhill twice, in 1951 and 1954.  He also won the Wengen downhill in 1954, the first of only ten racers to win both of these classic downhills in the same year.

External links
Database Olympics.com - Christian Pravda - profile

1927 births
1994 deaths
Austrian male alpine skiers
Olympic alpine skiers of Austria
Alpine skiers at the 1948 Winter Olympics
Alpine skiers at the 1952 Winter Olympics
Olympic silver medalists for Austria
Olympic bronze medalists for Austria
People from Kufstein
Olympic medalists in alpine skiing
Medalists at the 1952 Winter Olympics
Sportspeople from Tyrol (state)
20th-century Austrian people